Kabbage, Inc., is an online financial technology company based in Atlanta, Georgia. The company provides funding directly to small businesses and consumers through an automated lending platform. American Express acquired the company in 2020.

History
Kabbage publicly launched and began providing loans in May 2011. It is venture funded and backed by Reverence Capital Partners, SoftBank Capital, Thomvest Ventures, Mohr Davidow Ventures, and BlueRun Ventures. Additional investors include: ING, Santander InnoVentures, Lumia Capital, Scotiabank, TCW/Craton David Bonderman, Warren Stephens, the UPS Strategic Enterprise Fund, TriplePoint Ventures, and Jim McKelvey.

In 2012, it opened its San Francisco office. That same year, Kabbage raised US$30 million in Series C financing, led by Thomvest Ventures.

In February 2013, the company expanded internationally, entering the United Kingdom,. Also in 2013, it raised $75M in debt financing, led by Victory Park Capital and existing investor Thomvest Ventures.

In 2014, they raised an additional $106M in funding from SoftBank Capital, TCW/Craton, Lumia Capital, the UPS Strategic Enterprise Fund, Thomvest Ventures, BlueRun Ventures and Mohr Davidow Ventures. In April 2014, Kabbage closed a $270M credit facility from Guggenheim Securities, the investment banking and capital markets division of Guggenheim Partners.

It extends access to over $1 billion each year in working capital funded to small businesses.

In August 2016, Kroll Bond Rating Agency (KBRA) upgraded and affirmed ratings on Class A2-2 Certificates issued by Kabbage Funding 2014-1 Resecurization Trust.

In October 2016, Kabbage, as a founding member of the Innovative Lending Platform Association (ILPA), unveiled the SMART Box disclosure and comparison tool to help small businesses better assess and compare finance options.

In March 2017, Kabbage priced $525M of fixed-rate, asset-backed notes in a private securitization transaction.

In August 2017, the company announced the agreement of a $250M equity investment from a subsidiary of SoftBank Group Corp (“SoftBank”).

In November 2017, Kabbage closed a $200M debt facility with Credit Suisse, bringing its total debt funding to $750M. That month, Kabbage released new data gathered in partnership with Bredin, a leading small-business market research firm.

In 2018, together with Citigroup, the company formed a consortium to address fintech firms’ cybersecurity risks in response to recommendations in a World Economic Forum report.

Kabbage acquired Orchard, a provider of data, technology and analytics to the online lending industry, in 2018 to offer more data-driven services to small businesses and financial institutions.

In April 2019, Kabbage closed the largest asset-backed securitization by a small business online lending platform to date for $700M. The following month, Kabbage formed an alliance to provide the Building Trades Employers’ Association (BTEA) 1,300 contractor companies access to funding through the Kabbage® platform.

In July 2019, Kabbage closed a $200M four-year revolving credit facility.

In September 2019, Kabbage acquired Radius Intelligence, a technology company specializing in small business data acquisition and entity resolution, to add insights to its cash-flow solutions.

On October 16, 2020, Kabbage was acquired by American Express. 

In October 2022, Kabbage filed for Chapter 11 bankruptcy.

Fraud allegations
Kabbage was associated with large, fraudulent Paycheck Protection Program payouts during the COVID-19 pandemic.

Product
Kabbage provides small businesses with automated cash-flow solutions. Since March 2020, Kabbage suspended lending services for active and new customers in favor of offering loans to U.S. businesses through the PPP (Paycheck Protection Program) introduced as part of the Trump administration's COVID-19 economic stimulus package. Through their product, Kabbage Funding, customers can access lines of credit up to $250K. The company automates funding decisions based on a number of data factors, including business volume, time in business, transaction volume, social media activity, and the seller's credit score. Each draw against the line of credit is considered a separate loan issued by Celtic Bank, Member FDIC, with either six-, 12- or 18-month terms. Funds are deposited either into a bank or PayPal account. Each time a borrower takes a loan, he has six months or 12 months to pay it off. Kabbage customers typically utilize the funding platform for working capital for equipment and inventory purchases.

Kabbage expanded its business-to-mobile operations with an iOS and Android app in November 2012. That December, Kabbage began leveraging Square transaction data to underwrite funding.

In February 2014, Kabbage expanded its product offering to lend to brick-and-mortar businesses.

In August 2018, Kabbage customers began accessing more than $10M per day.

March 2015, Kabbage began licensing its lending platform to power lending for organizations interested in providing financing to their customers.

Kabbage introduced the Kabbage Card in May 2015, allowing businesses to pay for items at the point of sale with a purchasing card tied to their Kabbage account.

In September 2019, Kabbage launched the Kabbage Small Business Revenue Index, a tool using real-time data to provide insights into the ongoing revenue performance of small businesses in the U.S. across states and industries.

In October 2019, Kabbage launched Kabbage Payments, a new payment-processing solution for small businesses that includes a custom pay link, online no-fee invoicing, next-day deposits, and more. Shortly after, Kabbage announced custom loans for Kabbage Payments customers, marking the first integration of Kabbage Funding and Kabbage Payments, giving small businesses increased flexibility on term length and repayment method.

Just a month after launching custom loans, Kabbage announced the general launch of Kabbage Insights, a free tool to calculate and predict cash-flow patterns for small businesses.

In response to economic strains caused by COVID-19, Kabbage launched helpsmallbusiness.com, enabling anyone in the U.S. to purchase an online gift certificate from participating small businesses.

Interest rates
Kabbage charges a monthly fee between 1.5 and 10% of your loan principal. The fee is only charged during months you carry a balance.

Eligibility requirements 

Kabbage works on business performance, not credit score.

Partnerships
February 2012, Kabbage and United Parcel Service entered into an agreement, allowing small businesses to share their shipping histories with Kabbage. Kabbage entered into a partnership with Intuit QuickBooks in Spring 2013 that enables QuickBooks users to link their QuickBooks account to qualify and access capital through Kabbage. Kabbage partnered with Stripe, a company that enables businesses to instantly accept credit card payments online, in August 2013 to underwrite customers based exclusively on Stripe's payment processing data. Kabbage also teamed up with Xero, a leader in online accounting software, to extend funding to Xero's customers by leveraging their online accounting data.

March 2015, Kabbage launched its first platform lending partnership with Australia-based Kikka Capital to establish a new small business product powered entirely by Kabbage technology. Through this partnership, Kabbage provides the onboarding, underwriting, and monitoring technology platform, while Kikka Capital manages the operations, marketing funding, and loan servicing.

May 2015, Sage Payment Solutions became the first third-party organization to leverage Kabbage's technology and data platform. Within that same year, Kabbage also established a partnership with MasterCard to allow Kabbage's data and technology platform to be available within their business network. In July 2015, Kabbage established a partnership with Experian, allowing Experian to leverage Kabbage's automated lending platform to its institutional clients serving small businesses and consumers. In March 2016, Kabbage began partnering with the National Federation of Independent Business to make funding from Kabbage available to its members with the click of the button.

In January 2019, Kabbage partnered with Alibaba.com to power its Pay Later program, providing small businesses purchasing on Alibaba.com the ability to be approved for and access financing at the point of sale.

In May 2019, Kabbage partnered with Azlo to launch Mission Street Capital, a program that provides small businesses with an Azlo account access to funding through Kabbage's products.

In November 2019, Kabbage partnered with GoDaddy to make its online lending platform available for GoDaddy's U.S. customers.

References

Online financial services companies of the United States
Financial services companies established in 2009
2009 establishments in Georgia (U.S. state)
American companies established in 2009
Companies based in Atlanta
Internet properties established in 2009
2020 mergers and acquisitions
American Express
Companies that filed for Chapter 11 bankruptcy in 2022